Jim Roth is a businessman, social entrepreneur and author. He is the co-founder of LeapFrog Investments, a social finance and impact investment firm that manages investments of more than $1 billion.

Biography
Roth received a degree in Development Economics from the University of Manchester and a PhD from the University of Cambridge. While working towards his PhD, Roth spent time examining how individuals with a low income used financial services.

Prior to co-founding Leapfrog, he worked for the United Nations agency, International Labour Organization (ILO), in India. During his time at the ILO, Roth co-authored the book, Making Insurance Work for Microfinance Institutions. Roth has appeared on Bloomberg and CNBC discussing issues around the rise of the emerging consumer demographic and the role of financial services in emerging markets.

References

External links
Making Insurance Work for Microfinance Institutions
Why Investing in Insurance in Emerging Markets Makes Sense - Bloomberg video

Year of birth missing (living people)
Living people
Social entrepreneurs
21st-century English writers
21st-century English businesspeople
British business writers
Alumni of the University of Manchester
Alumni of the University of Cambridge
International Labour Organization people
British officials of the United Nations